The Rough Guide to the Music of Eastern Europe is a world music compilation album originally released in 1998. Part of the World Music Network Rough Guides series, the album gives broad coverage to the music of Central Europe and the music of Eastern Europe, focusing on traditional styles. Five of the fifteen tracks hail from Bulgaria, four are from Hungary, two are Macedonian, and Romania, Russia, Poland, and Albania contribute one track each. The compilation was produced by Phil Stanton, co-founder of the World Music Network.

Critical reception

Steven McDonald of AllMusic called it "good" but "curiously unsatisfying", blaming the size of the area covered. Writing for the Voice of America traditional music program Roots & Branches, Jo Morrison was more positive, considering the wide scope a "wonderful whirlwind tour", and the CD a continuation of the "high-quality" tradition of the series.

Track listing

References

External links 
 

1998 compilation albums
World Music Network Rough Guide albums